The 1951 Delaware Fightin' Blue Hens football team was an American football team that represented the University of Delaware as an independent during the 1951 college football season. The team compiled a 5–3 record and outscored opponents by a total of 173 to 109. John DeGasperis was the team captain. The team played its home games at Wilmington Park in Wilmington, Delaware.

David M. Nelson was hired as the program's head football coach in February 1951. He head previously served as the head football coach and athletic director at the University of Maine. Nelson served as the head coach until 1965 and as athletic director until 1984.

Schedule

References

Delaware
Delaware Fightin' Blue Hens football seasons
Delaware Fightin' Blue Hens football